Leiston railway station was a station in Leiston, Suffolk. It was closed in 1966 as part of the Beeching Axe as much of the British rural rail network was cut back. Today the old station survives intact, as the line is still used to service the nearby nuclear power station at Sizewell.

History

Passenger services lasted up until 1966 when the line closed to passengers. In August 1967, the track between Aldeburgh and Sizewell siding was taken up using steam cranes. By 1969, all that remained was one single line to Sizewell. In 2005, The line through the station was used for staff road training.

References

Disused railway stations in Suffolk
Former Great Eastern Railway stations
Beeching closures in England
Railway stations in Great Britain opened in 1859
1859 establishments in England
Railway stations in Great Britain closed in 1966
Leiston